BKL may mean:

 Cleveland Burke Lakefront Airport, Ohio, United States
 Big Kernel Lock, a Linux kernel mechanism
 Berik, by ISO 639-3 language code - see ISO 639:b
 BKL singularity, or Belinsky–Khalatnikov–Lifshitz singularity, a Universe evolution model
 Bickley railway station, by station code
 Bolshaya Koltsevaya line, a prospective line of Moscow Metro

See also